Funmi is a Nigerian feminine given name meaning "for me" or "give me" in Yoruba. It is a diminutive version of names such as: 
 "Olufunmilola/Oluwafunmilola" (God has given me wealth) or "Funmilola" (give me wealth) 
 "Olufunmilayo/Oluwafunmilayo" (God has given me joy) or "Funmilayo" (give me joy).

Notable people with the name include:
Funmilayo Ransome-Kuti (born 1900, died 1978),  Nigerian educator, politician and women's rights activist
Funmilayo Olayinka (born 1960, died 2013), Nigerian banker and politician
Oluwafunmilayo Olajumoke Atilade (born 1952), Nigerian jurist
Funmilayo Olopade (born 1957, Nigerian American physician
Funmi Aragbaye (born 1954), Nigerian gospel singer, songwriter and televangelist 
Funmi Falana, Nigerian legal practitioner and women's rights activist
Funmi Fadoju (born 2002), English netball player
Funmi Iyanda (born 1971), Nigerian talk show host, broadcaster, journalist, and blogger 
Funmi Jimoh (born 1984), American long jumper 
Funmi Olonisakin, British-Nigerian scholar 
Funmi Tejuosho (born 1965), Nigerian politician
Olajumoke Olufunmilola Adenowo (born, 1968), Nigerian architect
Rachel Akosua Funmilola Garton (born 1991), Nigerian singer.

References

Yoruba given names
African feminine given names